The KDE Gear (also known as the KDE Applications Bundle or KDE Applications) is a set of applications and supporting libraries that are developed by the KDE community, primarily used on Linux-based operating systems but mostly multiplatform, and released on a common release schedule. 

The bundle is composed of over 100 applications. Examples of prominent applications in the bundle include the file manager Dolphin, document viewer Okular, text editor Kate, archiving tool Ark and terminal emulator Konsole.

Previously the KDE Applications Bundle was part of the KDE Software Compilation.

Extragear 
Software that is not part of the official KDE Applications bundle can be found in the "Extragear" section. They release on their own schedule and feature their own versioning numbers. There are many standalone applications like KTorrent, Krita or Amarok that are mostly designed to be portable between operating systems and deployable independent of a particular workspace or desktop environment. Some brands consist of multiple applications, such as Calligra Office Suite or KDE Kontact.
 There are several options for obtaining and installing KDE applications under Linux.  Moreover, most of the KDE platform and applications have been ported to OpenBSD and NetBSD.  While prior editions of KDE were often seen on other flavors of Unix, such as Solaris the popularity of the open source alternatives running on a wide range of hardware (having been ported to nearly every RISC and x86_64 processors) has made KDE projects on similar OSs less obvious.
 Many of the applications listed are available for Windows, macOS, and increasingly Android and iOS as well.

Documentation
 [Documentation web site] has HTML and PDF version of the KDE software manuals.  
 Other sources

Source code 
KDE Source code is available from the [Gitlab] and [Download web site.].

Microsoft Windows Applications 
 KDE Windows software is available in the Windows store, downloaded from the [Windows Apps] site, or from individual project sites (e.g. KDevelop has nightly releases of Windows 32 and 64 bit software).
 Elisa Music Player
 Filelight Disk Usage Statistics
 GCompris Educational Game for Children
 Kate Advanced Text Editor (part of KDevelop as well)
 KDE Connect Device Synchronization
 Kile LaTeX Frontend
 Krita Digital Painting comparable to Adobe Photoshop or GIMP
 KStars Desktop Planetarium
 KTimeTracker Personal Time Tracker
 LabPlot Advanced Data Visualization and Analysis software
 NeoCHat Matrix Client
 Okular Document and Ebook Viewer (PDF, EPUB, DJVU, etc.)
 RKWard GUI Front-end for Statistics with R
 Ruqola Rocket.Chat client

macOS Applications

Android Applications

iOS Applications

Linux 
Most Linux users can simply install some or all of KDE using their distribution's software repository.

List of applications part of the bundle

Development

Software development

KDE SDK   is a collection of two dozen distinct integrated (both within the SDK but also with other KDE applications, e.g. many work with Dolphin, the default file manager) applications and components that work with/are part of KDevelop, and is suitable for general purpose software development in a range of languages.  It provides the tooling used to engineer KDE, and is particularly rich in tools to support Qt and C++ development, as well as the more fashionable Rust, Python, etc.
Most of the KDE SDK is available for Windows and macOS in addition to Linux and BSD.  
While created for the KDE desktop, prebuilt [software], including nightly releases, is available for Mac OS, Linux (via AppImage, AppStream or Flathub, as well as Snap), as well as via most major Linux distributions package managers, in addition to the source code via KDE Gitlab .  
 Windows installers for production/released version of  Kate, KDevelop and Umbrello are available as well as via the [store].
Several KDE applications are available for Android using the Kirigami framework. built using KDevelop including KDE Connect, KDE Itinerary, a digital travel assistant that integrates train, bus, and air bookings with maps, the KDE Kalendar application, and boarding passes, and KAlgebra, a graphing scientific calculator.
Various other packages are being built for testing on Android, although plans for some of the core parts of the SDK (e.g. Kate) have not been announced.
Unless noted, KDE applications can use KIO slaves for ftp, http, ftp over ssh (fish) , Google drive, WebDAV to browse/access files just as they can local files, samba (Windows shared files), archives, man,  and info pages. E.g. to browse a WebDAV location, in place of the file path,  webdav://www.hostname.com/path/. 
 The various components can be used on their own (e.g. Kate as a general purpose text editor) on their own, or in combination (e.g. Kate uses KDiff3 internally to compare cached autorecovery file with the last saved version).
 Kate – an advanced text editor for programmers, and general text editor. 
As of KDE 4, KEdit has been replaced by Kate &/or Kwrite.
 KDevelop – an integrated development environment for multiple languages, with a plug-in/extension framework (e.g. plug-ins for PHP, Ruby, Python, Markdown documentation authoring/preview, a SVG viewer, etc.), and control flow viewer.
Supported languages include:  C/C++ and ObjC (backed by the Clang/LLVM libraries)
Including some extra features for the Qt Framework
Including language support for CUDA and OpenCL
Qt QML and JavaScript, Python, PHP 
In addition to the "supported" languages, there is syntax highlighting for a wide range of mark-up, configuration, programming, scripting, and data languages.
 GUI integration with multiple different version control systems including Git, Bazaar, Subversion, CVS, Mercurial (hg), and Perforce.
 Support for CMake and QMake, as well as generic and custom build files.
 Cervisia – CVS frontend 

 KDESvn – graphical Subversion client
 KAppTemplate – Template-based code project generator
 KDiff3 – Diff/Patch frontend (see Comparison of file comparison tools)
 Kommander – Dynamic dialog editor
 Kompare – Diff/Patch frontend
 Lokalize – a computer–aided translation system
 Okteta - a hex editor
 Poxml
 Swappo
Clazy Qt-oriented static code analyzer based on the Clang framework
 Massif Visualizer – Visualizer for Valgrind Massif data files
 Umbrello – UML diagram application
ELF Dissector ELF binary inspector  
Fielding REST API tester 
Doxyqml Doxygen filter to allow generation of API Documentation for QML
 Heaptrack traces all memory allocations and annotates these events with stack traces. 
KDebugSettings 
KUIViewer  views UI files (e.g. from Qt Designer).
Dferry D-Buss library and tools
CuteHMI Open-source HMI (Human Machine Interface) software written in C++ and QML.

Web development
 KImageMapEditor – an HTML image map editor
 KXSLDbg – an XSLT debugger

Education

Science
 Cirkuit – An application to generate publication-ready figures
 KBibTeX – an application to manage bibliography databases in the BibTeX format
 Semantik – a mindmapping-like tool for document generation
 RKWard – an easy to use, transparent frontend to R

 KTechLab - an IDE for electronic and PIC microcontroller circuit design and simulation

Games

Toys
 AMOR – Amusing Misuse Of Resources. Desktop creature
 KTeaTime – Tea cooking timer
 KTux
 KWeather

Graphics

Internet

Multimedia

Playback

Production

Office
 Kontact provides personal information management, backed by the Akonadi framework (including Akregator, KNode, KMail, etc.)
 The Calligra Suite provides an office suite, including
 Calligra Flow – a flowchart and diagram editor
 Calligra Plan – a project management tool
 Calligra Sheets – Spreadsheet
 Calligra Stage – Presentation application
 Calligra Words – Word processor
 Kexi – a visual database creator
 KEuroCalc – a currency converter and calculator
 Kile – integrated LaTeX environment
 KMyMoney – a personal finance manager
 TaskJuggler – a project management tool
 Skrooge – Personal finances manager
 LabPlot – a data plotting and analysis tool
 LemonPOS – a point of sales application for small and mid–size business
 Tellico – a collection organizer

System

Utilities

Accessibility
 KMag – a screen magnifying tool
 KMouseTool – Automatic Mouse Click
 KMouth – a speech synthesizer frontend

Discontinued
Unmaintained Applications

next

Releases 

The KDE Applications Bundle is released every four months and has bugfix releases in each intervening month. A date-based version scheme is used, which is composed of the year and month. A third digit is used for bugfix releases.

With the April 2021 release, the KDE Applications Bundle has been renamed to KDE Gear.

See also
 List of GNOME applications

References

External links
 

 
KDE applications
Utilities for Linux
Utilities for macOS
Utilities for Windows